William Quan Judge (April 13, 1851 – March 21, 1896) was an Irish-American mystic, esotericist, and occultist, and one of the founders of the original Theosophical Society. He was born in Dublin, Ireland. When he was 13 years old, his family emigrated to the United States. He became a naturalized citizen of the USA at age 21 and passed the New York state bar exam, specializing in commercial law.

Judge was one of the seventeen co-founders of the Theosophical Society. Like Helena Petrovna Blavatsky and Henry Steel Olcott, he stayed in the organization when others left. When Olcott and Blavatsky left the United States for India, he stayed behind to manage the Society's work, all the while working as a lawyer.

When Blavatsky and Olcott left America, they left Theosophy in North America in Judge's hands. While Judge kept in close contact with both Blavatsky and Olcott through correspondence, there was little if any organized activity for the next several years. His difficulties over this period of time are illustrated by a biographical passage written by Mrs. Archibald Keightley: "It was a time when Madame Blavatsky – she who was then the one great exponent, had left the field ... the interest excited by her ... striking mission had died down. The T.S. was henceforth to subsist on its philosophical basis ... From his twenty - third year until his death, (Mr. Judge's) best efforts and all the fiery energies of his undaunted soul were given to this work."

In 1876, business affairs caused him to visit South America, where he contracted "Chagres fever", and he was ever after a sufferer from that torturing disease. Other "phases" of his experiences on this journey are recorded in his writings, often allegorical, suggesting the character of the occult contacts which may have been established on this journey.

In India, Blavatsky established a new headquarters. As a European, her efforts to restore respect for the Hindu faith were quite effective. As a result, she made enemies among the missionaries of Christianity. The Theosophical Movement 1875-1950 sets out some of the events that followed: "William Q. Judge, who arrived in India soon after the Coulombs had been sent away from headquarters, made a detailed examination of the false door constructed in Madam Blavatsky's "occult room". He showed the product of Coulomb's interrupted labours to some three hundred witnesses who signed their names to a description of the place. He removed the "shrine" in which the Coulombs had attempted to plant evidence of fraud. Even many years later, these actions provide cogent evidence of "the Coulomb Conspiracy" and vindicate Madame Blavatsky.  

In 1885, after his return to America, Judge set about to revitalize the Movement in the United States. The real beginning of the work of Theosophy in the United States began in 1886, when Judge established The Path, an independent Theosophical magazine. Until this time, not much had been accomplished in the way of growth of the Society in America.  Mr. Judge addressed the common man in homely language and with simple reason. The Path showed that he had found himself and was now cultivating the area of his greatest usefulness, as a writer. His natural interest in the welfare of others affected everything he did, so that his articles and Theosophical talks are cast in the idiom of the common man. In his first editorial, he wrote: "It is not thought that utopia can be established in a day ... Certainly, if we all say that it is useless ... nothing will ever be done. A beginning must be made and it has been made by the Theosophical society ... Riches are accumulating in the hands of the few while the poor are ground harder every day as they increase in number ... All this points unerringly to a vital error somewhere ... What is wanted is true knowledge of the spiritual condition of man, his aim, and destiny ... those who must begin the reform are those who are so fortunate as to be placed in the world where they can see and think out the problems all are endeavouring to solve, even if they know that the great day may not come until after their death." 

He also wrote: "The Christian nations have dazzled themselves with a baneful glitter of material progress. They are not the peoples who will furnish the clearest clues to the Path ... The Grand Clock of the Universe points to another hour, and now Man must seize the key in his hands and himself – as a whole – open the gate ... Our practice consists in a disregard of any authority in matters of religion and philosophy except such propositions as from their innate quality we feel to be true."

It has been said of Judge: "Everything he wrote of a metaphysical nature can be found, directly or indirectly, in the works of Madame Blavatsky. He attempted no new "revelation" but illustrated in his own works the ideal use of the concepts of the Theosophical Teachings." The Theosophical Mov't, 1875 - 1950. Over the years, Mr. Judge attracted to the Movement a nucleus of devoted followers. The movement grew steadily in America.

Judge wrote theosophical articles for various theosophical magazines, and also the introductory volume, The Ocean of Theosophy in 1893. He became the General Secretary of the American Section of the Theosophical Society in 1884, with Abner Doubleday as President.

Judge left no record of the period before the founding of the Theosophical Society but some of his published statements reveal the character of his relationship with Blavatsky during this period. On the occasion of her death in 1891, he referred to their first meeting in her rooms in January 1875. He wrote:

It was her eye that attracted me, the eye of one whom I must have known in lives long passed away. She looked at me in recognition for that first hour, and never since has that look changed. Not as a questioner of philosophies did I come before her, not as one groping in the dark for lights that schools and fanciful theories had obscured, but as one who, wandering through the corridors of life, was seeking the friends who could show where the designs for the work had been hidden. And, true to the call, she responded, revealing plans once again, and speaking no words to explain, simply pointed them out and went on with the task. It was as if but the evening before we had parted, leaving yet to be done some detail of a task taken up with one common end; it was teacher and pupil, elder brother and younger, both bent on the one single end, but she with the power and knowledge that belong but to lions and sages.

Blavatsky often referred to the founding of the Theosophical Society as coming about as a result of occult direction from her teachers. Judge later wrote that the objects of the Society had been given to Olcott by the Masters before the meeting at which they were adopted. Thus, the founding of the Theosophy Society may be seen to have been inspired.

In 1881, looking back on the founding of the Society, Blavatsky wrote: "Our society as a body might certainly be wrecked by mismanagement or the death of its founders, but the IDEA which it represents and which has gained so wide a currency, will run on like a crested wave of thought until it dashes upon the hard beach where materialism is picking and sorting its pebbles ... " At this time, the affairs of the Society were largely in Olcott's hands. Meetings were held irregularly, and many plans for occult experimentation were proposed. Neither Blavatsky nor Judge took any active part in the meetings after the first few sessions. He was busy with his law practice. She was beginning to write her first book, Isis Unveiled.

After Blavatsky died in 1891, Judge became involved in a dispute with Olcott and Annie Besant, whom he considered to have deviated from the original teaching of the Mahatmas. As a result, he ended his association with Olcott and Besant during 1895 and took most of the Society's American Section with him. Despite being hounded by devotees to Besant, Judge managed his new organization for about a year until his death in New York City, whereupon Katherine Tingley became manager. The organization originating from the faction of Olcott and Besant is based nowadays in India and known as the Theosophical Society - Adyar, while the organization managed by Judge is known nowadays simply as the Theosophical Society, but often with the specification, "international headquarters, Pasadena, California".

Judge died in 1896 in New York City.

In 1898, Ernest Temple Hargrove, who had initially supported Tingley, left with other members to form the Theosophical Society in America (Hargrove) Branch.  Other new organizations split off from his, including the Temple of the People (whose library bears his name) during 1898 and the United Lodge of Theosophists or ULT during 1909.

References

External links 

 
The Edgar Rice Burroughs Library
Books by Judge
Articles by Judge
Theosophy Library Online
Articles by William Quan Judge and his biography
 
 

1851 births
1896 deaths
19th-century Irish people
Irish writers
Irish occultists
Irish occult writers
American occult writers
Irish Theosophists
American Theosophists
Irish emigrants to the United States (before 1923)
People from Dublin (city)
Naturalized citizens of the United States